Tradescanticola is a genus of moths in the family Sesiidae.

Species
Tradescanticola yildizae Kocak, 1983

References

Sesiidae